Domènec Torrent Font (born 14 July 1962) is a Spanish professional football manager and former player. He recently managed Turkish club Galatasaray.

After playing and coaching at an amateur level, Torrent became an assistant to Pep Guardiola at Barcelona, Bayern Munich and Manchester City. He then managed in his own right at New York City, Flamengo, and Galatasaray.

Playing career
Born in Santa Coloma de Farners, Girona, Catalonia, Torrent played as a midfielder. He joined UE Olot in 1980 from hometown side CE Farners; Olot paid for his transfer by arranging a friendly against his former club. He left Olot in 1983, and subsequently joined AD Guíxols, where he retired at the age of just 27 to become a coach.

Managerial career

Early career
Torrent started his coaching career in 1991 with hometown side CE Farners, and led the club to a promotion to Regional Preferente (sixth tier) in 1994. He announced that he would leave the club in May 1996, and subsequently took over UD Cassà also in the sixth level in July. In July 1997, Torrent was appointed in charge of AE Roses, still in division six. He offered his resignation in November, which was refused by the club's board, but was still sacked the following January.

In May 1998, Torrent was named manager of FC Palafrugell in the Primera Catalana; with the side he achieved promotion to Tercera División in 2000, and led the club to a sixth position in the 2001–02 campaign, the best of their history. In July 2003, Torrent was appointed manager of Segunda División B side Palamós, but suffered relegation at the end of the season; he subsequently left the club the following May. On 29 March 2005, he was named manager of fellow third division strugglers Girona FC, replacing Josep María Nogués, but was unable to avoid the drop.

Working with Guardiola
In 2007, after managing Girona, Torrent joined Pep Guardiola's staff at FC Barcelona B, initially to work in as a tactical analyst. After the promotion to the third division and Guardiola's subsequent appointment as manager of the first team in May 2008, Torrent also went up to the first team under the same role. Torrent remained with Guardiola as the latter moved to FC Bayern Munich and Manchester City, winning 24 trophies in eleven years together.

New York City
On 11 June 2018, citing a desire to return to head coaching, Torrent was named the new head coach at Major League Soccer side New York City FC, replacing Patrick Vieira. He signed a three-year contract through the 2020 season. His first professional match occurred on 24 June, as NYCFC defeated Toronto FC 2–1 at Yankee Stadium. In the playoffs, his team lost 4–1 on aggregate in the Eastern Conference semi-finals to eventual champions Atlanta United FC.

On 8 November 2019, New York City FC and Torrent mutually agreed to part ways. He left the club after achieving a franchise record 64 points in the 2019 campaign, also qualifying for the ensuing CONCACAF Champions League. The team were eliminated at the same stage of postseason by Toronto.

Flamengo
On 31 July 2020, Torrent was named in charge of Campeonato Brasileiro Série A reigning champions Flamengo after agreeing to a one-and-a-half-year contract. He lost 1–0 on his debut against Atlético Mineiro in the Maracanã Stadium. In the Copa Libertadores, the defending champions won their group despite a 5–0 loss at Ecuador's Independiente del Valle on 17 September.
 
On 9 November, after a 4–0 away loss against Atlético Mineiro, Torrent was relieved of his duties at the third-placed team.

Galatasaray
On 11 January 2022, Galatasaray chairman Burak Elmas announced that Torrent would replace Fatih Terim as the new manager of Galatasaray. He made his Süper Lig debut five days later in a 4–2 loss at Hatayspor. He succeeded to grab a historical 0-0 draw in Camp Nou against FC Barcelona in his UEFA Europa League debut. On 21 June 2022, Torrent was relieved from his contract after the poor results.

Personal life
Torrent is the grandson of a former Barcelona player.

Managerial statistics

Honours

Assistant coach
Barcelona B
Tercera División: 2007–08

Barcelona
La Liga: 2008–09, 2009–10, 2010–11
Copa del Rey: 2008–09, 2011–12
Supercopa de España: 2009, 2010, 2011
UEFA Champions League: 2008–09, 2010–11
UEFA Super Cup: 2009, 2011
FIFA Club World Cup: 2009, 2011

Bayern Munich
Bundesliga: 2013–14, 2014–15, 2015–16
DFB-Pokal: 2013–14, 2015–16
UEFA Super Cup: 2013
FIFA Club World Cup: 2013

Manchester City
Premier League: 2017–18
EFL Cup: 2017–18

References

External links

1962 births
Living people
People from Santa Coloma de Farners
Sportspeople from the Province of Girona
Spanish footballers
Footballers from Catalonia
Association football midfielders
Tercera División players
UE Olot players
Spanish football managers
Segunda División B managers
Tercera División managers
Palamós CF managers
Girona FC managers
FC Barcelona non-playing staff
FC Bayern Munich non-playing staff
Manchester City F.C. non-playing staff
Major League Soccer coaches
New York City FC coaches
CR Flamengo managers
Galatasaray S.K. (football) managers
Campeonato Brasileiro Série A managers
Süper Lig managers
Spanish expatriate football managers
Spanish expatriate sportspeople in Germany
Spanish expatriate sportspeople in England
Spanish expatriate sportspeople in the United States
Spanish expatriate sportspeople in Brazil
Spanish expatriate sportspeople in Turkey
Expatriate soccer managers in the United States
Expatriate football managers in Brazil